The City of Edmonton, the provincial capital of Alberta, Canada is divided into 7 geographic sectors and 375 neighbourhoods, not including those proposed and planned neighbourhoods that have yet to be developed. This article generally describes each sector, their neighbourhoods, and the applicable intermediary areas between the sector and neighbourhood geographic levels.


Mature area sector 
Edmonton's mature area sector, or inner city, corresponds with those neighbourhoods deemed mature neighbourhoods in the city's municipal development plan. The sector's neighbourhoods, primarily residential in nature, were essentially built out prior to 1970. It includes the city's central core, which includes its downtown. It also includes neighbourhoods within the five former municipalities that Edmonton absorbed between 1912 and 1964, as well as mature neighbourhoods beyond the central core and these municipalities.

Central core 

Edmonton's central core comprises Downtown Edmonton and its 11 surrounding neighbourhoods including Boyle Street, Central McDougall, McCauley, Oliver, Queen Mary Park, Riverdale and Rossdale on the north side of the North Saskatchewan River and Cloverdale, Garneau, Strathcona and the University of Alberta on the south side of the river.

Downtown 

Edmonton's downtown core, officially named as Downtown, is generally bounded by 109 Street and 111 Street to the west, 105 Avenue to the north, 97 Street to the east, Grierson Hill and Rossdale Road to the southeast, and 97 Avenue and Rossdale Road to the south.

Development within Downtown is guided by the Capital City Downtown Plan. The plan subdivides Downtown into five smaller neighbourhoods, of which four of the five are further subdivided into sub areas.

Capital City District
Capital Boulevard Area
Legislature Grounds

Commercial-Cultural Core
Arts District
Commercial Core
River's Edge Area
Station Lands Area

Jasper Avenue
 
McKay Avenue Neighbourhood
McKay Avenue Residential Area
Victoria McKay Avenue Mixed Use Area

Warehouse Campus Neighbourhood
Central Warehouse Area
Heritage Area
MacEwan Area
Railtown Area

Former municipalities 

The City of Edmonton has absorbed five urban municipalities in its history – the City of Strathcona in 1912, the Village of North Edmonton in 1912, the Village of West Edmonton (Calder) in 1917, the Town of Beverly in 1961 and the Town of Jasper Place in 1964. The boundaries of these former municipalities are wholly within Edmonton's mature area sector.

Beverly 

In the late 1950s, the Town of Beverly was bounded by 50 Street to the west and the North Saskatchewan River and 104 Avenue to the south, while its eastern boundary comprised 36 Street south of 118 Avenue and 34 Street north of 118 Avenue. Its northern boundary was located north of the Canadian National (CN) main line, generally paralleling it in a northwest direction from 34 Street to a quarter section line and then following this line west to 50 Street just south of 127 Avenue. Annexed by Edmonton in 1961, the City of Edmonton indicates Beverly's former boundaries are 50 Street to the west, Yellowhead Trail to the north and the river to the south and east.

Edmonton neighbourhoods within the former Town of Beverly include Abbottsfield, Beacon Heights, Bergman, Beverly Heights and Rundle Heights.

Jasper Place 

Prior to being absorbed by the City of Edmonton, the Town of Jasper Place was bounded by 149 Street to the east, 118 Avenue to the north and 170 Street to the west, while its southern boundary comprised 79 Avenue west of 156 Street and the North Saskatchewan River east of 156 Street.

Edmonton residential neighbourhoods within the former Town of Jasper Place include Britannia Youngstown, Canora, Elmwood, Glenwood, High Park, Jasper Park, Lynnwood, Mayfield, Meadowlark Park, Rio Terrace, Sherwood, West Jasper Place and West Meadowlark Park. Industrial neighbourhoods formerly within Jasper Place include Alberta Park Industrial, Garside Industrial, High Park Industrial, Norwester Industrial, Sheffield Industrial, West Sheffield Industrial and Youngstown Industrial.

North Edmonton 

Prior to being absorbed by the City of Edmonton on July 22, 1912, the Village of North Edmonton consisted of four quarter sections of land in northeast corner of Edmonton's mature area sector. The former village, bounded by 58 Street to the east, 122 Avenue to the south, 74 Street to the west and 132 Avenue to the north, now includes portions of the neighbourhoods of Balwin, Belvedere, Industrial Heights, Kennedale Industrial and Yellowhead Corridor East.

Strathcona 

Prior to amalgamating with the City of Edmonton, the City of Strathcona was bounded by the North Saskatchewan River to the west and north and 91 Street to the east, while its southern boundary comprised 62 Avenue east of 111 Street and 68 Avenue west of 111 Street. Whitemud Creek comprised the brief portion of the Strathcona's west boundary between 68 Avenue and the river.

Edmonton neighbourhoods wholly within the former City of Strathcona include Belgravia, CPR Irvine, Garneau, Hazeldean, McKernan, Mill Creek Ravine North, Queen Alexandra, Ritchie, River Valley Mayfair, River Valley Walterdale (including the former neighbourhood of Walterdale), Strathcona, Strathcona Junction (formerly CPR West), the University of Alberta and Windsor Park. Neighbourhoods partially within the eastern portion of the former City of Strathcona include Bonnie Doon, Cloverdale, King Edward Park, Mill Creek Ravine South and Strathearn. Neighbourhoods partially within the southern portion of the former city include Allendale, Calgary Trail North, Parkallen, River Valley Whitemud, Rosedale Industrial and the University of Alberta Farm. Five of the neighbourhoods wholly or partially within the former city – Cloverdale, Garneau, River Valley Walterdale, Strathcona and the University of Alberta – are also within Edmonton's central core.

West Edmonton 

Prior to being absorbed by the City of Edmonton on April 17, 1917, the Village of West Edmonton, also known as Calder, comprised one quarter section at the northeast corner of 127 Street and 127 Avenue near the northwest corner of Edmonton's mature area sector. This quarter section now forms the western half of the Calder neighbourhood.

Casselman-Steele Heights 

The southwest portion of the Casselman-Steele Heights residential area is located within Edmonton's mature area sector, consisting of the York neighbourhood bounded by 144 Avenue to the north, 50 Street to the east, Manning Drive to the southeast, 137 Avenue to the south and 66 Street to the west. The balance of the Casselman-Steele Heights residential area is located within Edmonton's northeast sector.

Dickinsfield 

Dickinsfield is located at the northern edge of the mature area sector. Consisting of the neighbourhoods of Evansdale and Northmount, the area is bounded by 97 Street (Highway 28) to the west, 137 Avenue to the south, 82 Street to the east, and 153 Avenue to the north.

Londonderry 

Londonderry is located at the northern edge of the mature area sector. Consisting of the neighbourhoods of Kildare and Kilkenny, the area is bounded by 82 Street to the west, 137 Avenue to the south, 66 Street to the east, and 153 Avenue to the north.

Other areas  
The following is a list of other neighbourhoods within Edmonton's mature area sector.

Abbottsfield
Alberta Avenue
Argyll
Aspen Gardens
Athlone
Avonmore
Balwin (portion was within the original Village of North Edmonton)
Bellevue
Belvedere (portion was within the original Village of North Edmonton)
Blatchford
Bonnie Doon
Calder (portion was within the original Village of West Edmonton)
Calgary Trail North
Calgary Trail South
Capilano
Crestwood
Cromdale
Delton
Delwood
Dovercourt
Duggan
Eastwood
Edmonton Northlands
Elmwood Park
Empire Park
Forest Heights
Fulton Place
Glengarry
Glenora
Gold Bar
Grandview Heights
Greenfield
Grovenor
Highlands
Holyrood
Idylwylde
Inglewood
Kenilworth
Kensington
Killarney
King Edward Park
Lansdowne
Lauderdale
Laurier Heights
Lendrum Place
Malmo Plains
McQueen
Montrose
Newton
North Glenora
Ottewell
Parkdale
Parkview
Patricia Heights
Pleasantview
Prince Charles
Prince Rupert
Quesnell Heights
Rideau Park
Rosslyn
Royal Gardens
Rundle Heights
Sherbrooke
Spruce Avenue
Strathcona
Strathearn
Terrace Heights
University of Alberta Farm
Virginia Park
Wellington
Westbrook Estates
Westmount
Westwood
Woodcroft

North sector 
Edmonton's suburban north sector is bounded by 142 Street to the west, Sturgeon County including CFB Edmonton to the north, and 66 Street to the east. Its southern boundary is formed by 137 Avenue and 153 Avenue west and east of 97 Street (Highway 28) respectively.

Castle Downs 

Castle Downs, including Castle Downs Extension, is located in the central portion of Edmonton's north sector. The area is bounded by 127 Street to the west and Anthony Henday Drive (Highway 216) to the north. To the east, it is bounded by 97 Street to the north of 153 Avenue and Castle Downs Road (113A Street) to the south of 153 Avenue. To the south, it is bounded by 137 Avenue to the west of Castle Downs Road and 153 Avenue to the east of Castle Downs Road. The following 11 neighbourhoods comprise Castle Downs.

Baranow
Baturyn
Beaumaris
Caernarvon

Canossa
Carlisle
Chambery
Dunluce

Elsinore
Lorelei
Rapperswill

Lake District 

Lake District, also known as Edmonton North, is located in the eastern portion of Edmonton's north sector. The area is bounded by 97 Street (Highway 28) to the west, Anthony Henday Drive (Highway 216) to the north, 66 Street to the east and 153 Avenue to the south. The following nine neighbourhoods comprise Lake District.

Belle Rive
Crystallina Nera
Crystallina Nera East

Eaux Claires
Klarvatten
Lago Lindo

Mayliewan
Ozerna
Schonsee

The Palisades 

The Palisades is located in the western portion of Edmonton's north sector. The area is bounded by a Canadian National rail line to the west, Anthony Henday Drive (Highway 216) to the north, 127 Street to the east and 137 Avenue to the south. The following six neighbourhoods comprise The Palisades.

Albany
Carlton

Cumberland
Hudson

Oxford
Pembina

Other areas  
Other neighbourhoods within Edmonton's north sector not within larger residential areas include Goodridge Corners
and Griesbach.

Northeast sector 
Edmonton's suburban northeast sector is generally bounded by 66 Street and CFB Edmonton within Sturgeon County to the west, Highway 37 to the north, 33 Street NE to the northeast, the North Saskatchewan River to the east and southeast, and Yellowhead Trail (Highway 16) to the south. Its southwestern boundary is formed by portions of a Canadian National (CN) rail line, Fort Road, 50 Street and 144 Avenue.

Casselman-Steele Heights 

The majority of Casselman-Steele Heights is located in the southwest portion of Edmonton's northeast sector. The area is bounded by 66 Street to the west, 153 Avenue to the north, a Canadian National rail line to the east and 137 Avenue to the south. The portion of the area south of 144 Avenue and west of 50 Street, the York neighbourhood, is located outside the northeast sector in the adjacent mature area sector. The following four neighbourhoods comprise the northeast sector portion of Casselman-Steele Heights.

Casselman
Ebbers

McLeod

Miller

Clareview 

Clareview is located in the south-central portion of Edmonton's northeast sector. The area is generally bounded by a Canadian National rail line to the west, a power line right-of-way to the north of 153 Avenue to the north, the North Saskatchewan River valley and 18 Street to the east, and 130 Avenue and the Kennedale Ravine to the south. The following eight neighbourhoods comprise Clareview.

Bannerman
Belmont
Clareview Town Centre

Fraser
Hairsine
Kernohan

Kirkness
Sifton Park

Hermitage 

Hermitage is located in the southern portion of Edmonton's northeast sector. The area is bounded by 50 Street to the west, 130 Avenue and the Kennedale Ravine to the north, the North Saskatchewan River valley to the east and Yellowhead Trail (Highway 16) and a Canadian National rail line to the south. The following three neighbourhoods comprise Hermitage.

Canon Ridge

Homesteader

Overlanders

Horse Hill 

Horse Hill is located in the northeast portion of Edmonton's northeast sector. The area is bounded by Manning Drive (Highway 15) to the northwest, Anthony Henday Drive (Highway 216) to the southwest, the North Saskatchewan River valley to the south and east, and 33 Street NE to the northeast.

Evergreen
Horse Hill Neighbourhood 1 (future)

Horse Hill Neighbourhood 3 (future)
Horse Hill Neighbourhood 4 (future)

Horse Hill Neighbourhood 5 (future)
Marquis

Pilot Sound 

Pilot Sound is located in the north-central portion of Edmonton's northeast sector. The area is bounded by 66 Street to the west, Anthony Henday Drive (Highway 216) to the north and northeast and 153 Avenue to the south. The following six neighbourhoods comprise Pilot Sound.

Brintnell
Cy Becker

Gorman
Hollick-Kenyon

Matt Berry
McConachie

Northwest sector 
Edmonton's suburban northwest sector is generally bounded by 111 Avenue and Mayfield Road to the southeast, Stony Plain Road (Highway 16A) to the south, 231 Street (Parkland County) to the west, and Big Lake (Sturgeon County) and the City of St. Albert to the north. Its eastern boundary is formed by portions of 142 Street, a Canadian National (CN) rail line, Mark Messier Trail (Highway 2) and Yellowhead Trail (Highway 16).

Big Lake 

Big Lake is located in the northwest portion of Edmonton's northwest sector. The area is bounded by 231 Street to the west, Big Lake to the northwest, 137 Avenue to the northeast, Ray Gibbon Drive and Anthony Henday Drive (Highway 216) to the east, and Yellowhead Trail (Highway 16) to the south, excluding the Big Lake Estates country residential subdivision located at the northeast corner of Yellowhead Trail and 231 Street. The following five neighbourhoods comprise Big Lake.

Hawks Ridge
Kinglet Gardens

Pintail Landing
Starling

Trumpeter

Other areas  
Westview Village is a residential neighbourhood within Edmonton's northwest sector that is not within a larger residential area.

Southeast sector 
Edmonton's suburban southeast sector is generally bounded by 34 Street and Sherwood Park Freeway (Highway 100) to the northeast, Anthony Henday Drive (Strathcona County) to the east, 41 Avenue SW (Leduc County) to the south, Gateway Boulevard (Highway 2) to the west, and 63 Avenue/Argyll Road to the northwest. Its northern boundary is formed by portions of 75 Street, 76 Avenue, 71 Street, 82 Avenue, 50 Street and 101 Avenue.

Decoteau 

Decoteau is located in the southeast portion of Edmonton's southeast sector. The area is bounded by 50 Street SW to the west, 41 Avenue SW to the south, Meridian Street to the east, and a combination of Ellerslie Road, 34 Street SW and Anthony Henday Drive to the north. The following five neighbourhoods comprise Decoteau:

Alces
Decoteau

Kettle Lakes
Meltwater

Snowberry

Ellerslie 

Ellerslie is located in the southwest portion of Edmonton's southeast sector. The area is bounded by Gateway Boulevard (Highway 2) to the west, Anthony Henday Drive (Highway 216) to the north, 66 Street to the east and 41 Avenue SW to the south. The following five neighbourhoods comprise Ellerslie.

Ellerslie
Ellerslie Industrial

Ellerslie Neighbourhood 4 (future)
The Orchards at Ellerslie

Summerside

The Meadows 

The Meadows is located in the eastern portion of Edmonton's southeast sector. The area is bounded by 34 Street to the west, Whitemud Drive to the north and Anthony Henday Drive (Highway 216) to the east and south. The following seven neighbourhoods comprise The Meadows.

Aster
Larkspur
Laurel

Maple
Silver Berry

Tamarack
Wild Rose

Mill Woods 

Mill Woods is located in the central portion of Edmonton's southeast sector. The area is bounded by 91 Street to the west, Whitemud Drive to the north, 34 Street to the east and Anthony Henday Drive (Highway 216) to the south. Excluding the recreational neighbourhoods of Mill Woods Golf Course and Mill Woods Park, Mill Woods includes the following 24 neighbourhoods clustered within 9 communities.

Burnewood 

The Burnewood community comprises the following two neighbourhoods in the northeast portion of Mill Woods bounded by 50 Street to the west, Whitemud Drive to the north, 34 Street to the east and Mill Creek to the southwest.
Jackson Heights
Kiniski Gardens

Knottwood 

The Knottwood community comprises the following three neighbourhoods in the southwest portion of Mill Woods bounded by 91 Street to the west, 23 Avenue to the north, 66 Street to the east and Anthony Henday Drive to the south.
Ekota
Menisa
Satoo

Lakewood 

The Lakewood community comprises the following three neighbourhoods in the west portion of Mill Woods bounded by 91 Street to the west, 34 Avenue to the north, 66 Street to the east and 23 Avenue to the south, excluding Mill Woods Park south of 28 Avenue and east of Mill Woods Road.
Kameyosek
Meyonohk
Tipaskan

Mill Woods Town Centre 

The following two neighbourhoods are located within the central core of Mill Woods in an area bounded by 66 Street to the west, 34 Avenue to the north, 50 Street to the east and 23 Avenue to the south. They are not within any of the surrounding clusters of Mill Woods communities, however are part of the Woodvale community league. 
Mill Woods Town Centre
Tawa

Millbourne 

The Millbourne community comprises the following four neighbourhoods in the northwest portion of Mill Woods bounded by 91 Street to the west, Whitemud Drive to the north, 66 Street to the east and 34 Avenue to the south. The Millbourne community is divided into two smaller communities named North Millbourne and Leefield.
Lee Ridge (within Leefield)
Michaels Park (within North Millbourne)
Richfield (within Leefield)
Tweddle Place (within North Millbourne)

Millhurst 

The Millhurst community comprises the following two neighbourhoods in the south portion of Mill Woods bounded by 66 Street to the west, 23 Avenue to the north, 50 Street to the east and Anthony Henday Drive to the south.
Meyokumin
Sakaw

Ridgewood 

The Ridgewood community comprises the following three neighbourhoods in the east portion of Mill Woods bounded by 50 Street to the west, Mill Creek to the north, 34 Street to the east and 23 Avenue to the south.
Bisset
Minchau
Weinlos

Southwood 

The Southwood community comprises the following three neighbourhoods in the southeast portion of Mill Woods bounded by 50 Street to the west, 23 Avenue to the north, 34 Street to the east and Anthony Henday Drive to the south.
Crawford Plains
Daly Grove
Pollard Meadows

Woodvale 

The Woodvale community comprises the following two neighbourhoods in the north portion of Mill Woods bounded by 66 Street to the west, Mill Woods Golf Course to the north, 50 Street to the east and 34 Avenue to the south.
Greenview
Hillview

Southeast Edmonton 

Southeast Edmonton is located in the southern portion of Edmonton's southeast sector. The area is bounded by 66 Street to the west, Anthony Henday Drive (Highway 216) to the north, 50 Street to the east and 41 Avenue SW to the south. The following three neighbourhoods comprise Southeast Edmonton.

Charlesworth

Mattson

Walker

Other areas  
Other neighbourhoods within Edmonton's southeast sector not within larger residential areas include Maple Ridge, Rural South East and South Edmonton Common.

Southwest sector 
Edmonton's suburban southwest sector is generally bounded by the southern extent of the Westbrook Estates neighbourhood, 119 Street and 34 Avenue to the northeast, Calgary Trail/Gateway Boulevard (Highway 2) to the east, 41 Avenue SW (Leduc County) to the south, and the North Saskatchewan River to the west and northwest. Its northern boundary is formed by portions of the south bank of the North Saskatchewan River valley and the east bank of the Whitemud Creek ravine.

Heritage Valley 

Heritage Valley is located in the southeast portion of Edmonton's southwest sector. The area is bounded by Whitemud Creek to the west, Anthony Henday Drive (Highway 216) to the north, Calgary Trail to the east, and 41 Avenue SW to the south, excluding the Blackburne neighbourhood located at the southwest corner of Anthony Henday Drive and Calgary Trail. The following 15 neighbourhoods comprise Heritage Valley.

Allard
Blackmud Creek
Callaghan
Cashman
Cavanagh

Chappelle
Desrochers
Graydon Hill
Hays Ridge
Heritage Valley Neighbourhood 13 (future)

Heritage Valley Town Centre
MacEwan
Paisley
Richford
Rutherford

Kaskitayo 

Kaskitayo is located in the east portion of Edmonton's southwest sector. The area is bounded by Whitemud Creek to the west, 34 Avenue to the north, Calgary Trail to the east, and Anthony Henday Drive (Highway 216) to the south, excluding the Westbrook Estates neighbourhood located west of 119 Street and north of a power line right-of-way at approximately 30 Avenue. The following nine neighbourhoods comprise Kaskitayo.

Bearspaw
Blue Quill
Blue Quill Estates

Ermineskin
Keheewin
Skyrattler

Steinhauer
Sweet Grass
Twin Brooks

Riverbend 

Riverbend is located in the northwest portion of Edmonton's southwest sector. The area is bounded by the North Saskatchewan River valley to the west and north, Whitemud Creek to the east and a power line right-of-way at approximately 30 Avenue to the south. The following nine neighbourhoods comprise Riverbend.

Brander Gardens
Brookside
Bulyea Heights

Carter Crest
Falconer Heights
Henderson Estates

Ogilvie Ridge
Ramsay Heights
Rhatigan Ridge

Terwillegar Heights 

Terwillegar Heights is located in the west portion of Edmonton's southwest sector. The area is bounded by the North Saskatchewan River valley to the west, a power line right-of-way at approximately 30 Avenue to the north, Whitemud Creek to the east and Anthony Henday Drive (Highway 216) to the south.  The following seven neighbourhoods comprise Terwillegar Heights.

Haddow
Hodgson
Leger

Mactaggart
Magrath Heights

South Terwillegar
Terwillegar Towne

Windermere 

Windermere is located in the southwest portion of Edmonton's southwest sector. The area is bounded by the North Saskatchewan River valley to the west, Anthony Henday Drive (Highway 216) to the north, Whitemud Creek to the east and 41 Avenue SW to the south. The following six neighbourhoods comprise Windermere.

Ambleside
Glenridding Heights

Glenridding Ravine
Kendal

Keswick
Windermere

Other areas  
Blackburne is the lone residential neighbourhood within Edmonton's southwest sector not within a larger residential area.

West sector 
Edmonton's suburban west sector is bounded by Stony Plain Road (Highway 16A) to the north, 170 Street, the Patricia Ravine and the North Saskatchewan River to the east, and 33 Avenue SW to the south. Its western boundary is formed by 215 Street (Winterburn Road) and 231 Street to the south and north of Whitemud Drive respectively.

The Grange 

The Grange is located in the west-central portion of Edmonton's west sector. The area is bounded by 215 Street (Winterburn Road) to the west, Whitemud Drive to the north, Anthony Henday Drive (Highway 216) to the east and a combination of 45 Avenue and Lessard Road to the south. The following three neighbourhoods comprise The Grange.

Glastonbury

Granville

The Hamptons

Lewis Farms 

Lewis Farms is located in the northwest portion of Edmonton's west sector. The area is bounded by 231 Street to the west, Stony Plain Road (Highway 16A) to the north, Anthony Henday Drive (Highway 216) to the east and Whitemud Drive to the south. The following seven neighbourhoods comprise Lewis Farms.

Breckenridge Greens
Potter Greens
Rosenthal

Secord
Stewart Greens

Suder Greens
Webber Greens

Riverview 

Riverview is located in the south portion of Edmonton's west sector. The area is bounded by 33 Avenue SW to the south, 215 Street (Winterburn Road) to the west, the Wedgewood Ravine to the north, Anthony Henday Drive (Highway 216) to the northeast, and the North Saskatchewan River to the east.

Grandisle
River's Edge

Stillwater
The Uplands

White Birch

West Jasper Place 

West Jasper Place is located in the east portion of Edmonton's west sector. The area is bounded by Anthony Henday Drive (Highway 216) to the west, 100 Avenue to the north, 170 Street to the east and the North Saskatchewan River valley and ravine system to the southeast and south. The following 17 neighbourhoods comprise West Jasper Place.

Aldergrove
Belmead
Callingwood North
Callingwood South
Dechene
Donsdale

Gariepy
Jamieson Place
La Perle
Lymburn
Oleskiw
Ormsby Place

Summerlea
Terra Losa
Thorncliff
Wedgewood Heights
Westridge

Other areas  
Other neighbourhoods within Edmonton's west sector not within larger residential areas include Cameron Heights, Edgemont, Place LaRue and Rural West.

Industrial districts 
Four distinct industrial districts are located within Edmonton – the Edmonton Energy and Technology Park, Northeast Industrial, Northwest Industrial and South Industrial. The Northeast District, Northwest District and South District are each divided into smaller industrial neighbourhoods.

Edmonton Energy and Technology Park 
The Edmonton Energy and Technology Park (EETP) is located in the northern portion of Edmonton's northeast sector. The EETP is bounded by Canadian Forces Base Edmonton to the west, Highway 37 to the north, 33 Street NE (Range Road 231) to the east, Manning Drive (Highway 15) to the southeast and Anthony Henday Drive to the south. The EETP forms part of Alberta's Industrial Heartland. The EETP is wholly within Edmonton's Rural North East North Sturgeon neighbourhood and is not yet divided into smaller industrial neighbourhoods.

Northeast Industrial 
Industrial neighbourhoods within Edmonton's Northeast Industrial District include the following, with their relevant city sector indicated in parentheses.

Clover Bar Area (southeast), which includes the Aurum Energy Park (or Aurum Industrial Business Park)
Industrial Heights (northeast)

Kennedale Industrial (northeast)
Yellowhead Corridor East (mature area)

Yellowhead Corridor West (mature area)

The Northeast Industrial District specializes in the food and beverage industries.

Northwest Industrial 
Industrial neighbourhoods within Edmonton's Northwest Industrial District include the following, with their relevant city sector indicated in parentheses.

Alberta Park Industrial (northwest)
Armstrong Industrial (northwest)
Bonaventure Industrial (northwest)
Brown Industrial (northwest)
Carleton Square Industrial (northwest)
Dominion Industrial (northwest)
Edmiston Industrial (northwest)
Gagnon Estate Industrial (northwest)
Garside Industrial (northwest)
Hagmann Estate Industrial (mature area)

Hawin Park Estate Industrial (northwest)
High Park Industrial (northwest)
Huff Bremner Estate Industrial (northwest)
Kinokamau Plains Area (northwest)
McArthur Industrial (northwest)
McNamara Industrial (northwest)
Mistatim Industrial (northwest)
Mitchell Industrial (northwest)
Morin Industrial (northwest)
Norwester Industrial (northwest)
Poundmaker Industrial (northwest)

Rampart Industrial (northwest)
Sheffield Industrial (northwest)
Stone Industrial (northwest)
Sunwapta Industrial (northwest)
West Sheffield Industrial (northwest)
White Industrial (northwest)
Wilson Industrial (northwest)
Winterburn Industrial Area East (northwest)
Winterburn Industrial Area West (northwest)
Youngstown Industrial (northwest)

The Northwest Industrial District specializes in the transportation, warehousing and logistics industries.

Southeast Industrial 
Industrial neighbourhoods within Edmonton's South Industrial District, or Southeast Industrial District, include the following, with their relevant city sector indicated in parentheses.

Coronet Addition Industrial (southeast)
Coronet Industrial (southeast)
Davies Industrial East (southeast)
Davies Industrial West (southeast)
Eastgate Business Park (southeast)
Edmonton Research and Development Park (southeast)
Ellerslie Industrial (southeast, within the Ellerslie area)

Gainer Industrial (southeast)
Girard Industrial (southeast)
Lambton Industrial (southeast)
Maple Ridge Industrial (southeast)
McIntyre Industrial (southeast)
Morris Industrial (southeast)
Papaschase Industrial (southeast)

Parsons Industrial (southeast)
Pylypow Industrial (southeast)
Roper Industrial (southeast)
Rosedale Industrial (southeast)
Southeast Industrial (southeast)
Strathcona Industrial Park (southeast)
Weir Industrial (southeast)

The South Industrial District specializes in the machinery and equipment industries.

River valley and ravine system 
North Saskatchewan River valley and ravine system neighbourhoods within Edmonton include the following, with their relevant city sector indicated in parentheses.

North Saskatchewan River valley 

River Valley Cameron (west)
River Valley Capitol Hill (mature area)
River Valley Fort Edmonton (mature area)
River Valley Glenora (mature area)
River Valley Gold Bar (mature area)
River Valley Hermitage (northeast)
River Valley Highlands (mature area)

River Valley Kinnaird (mature area)
River Valley Laurier (mature area)
River Valley Lessard North (west)
River Valley Mayfair (mature area)
River Valley Oleskiw (west)
River Valley Riverside (mature area)

River Valley Rundle (mature area)
River Valley Terwillegar (southwest)
River Valley Victoria (mature area)
River Valley Walterdale (mature area)
River Valley Whitemud (mature area)
River Valley Windermere (southwest)

Mill Creek Ravine 

Mill Creek Ravine North (mature area)
Mill Creek Ravine South (mature area)

Whitemud Creek Ravine and southwest sector 

Blackmud Creek Ravine (southwest)
Whitemud Creek Ravine North (southwest)

Whitemud Creek Ravine South (southwest)
Whitemud Creek Ravine Twin Brooks (southwest)

Transportation and utility corridor 
Portions of Edmonton's transportation and utility corridor, which protects Anthony Henday Drive and adjacent lands for existing and future utilities, have been split into their own neighbourhoods. These neighbourhoods are as follows, with their relevant city sector indicated in parentheses.

Anthony Henday (west)
Anthony Henday Big Lake (northwest)
Anthony Henday Castledowns (north)
Anthony Henday Clareview (northeast)
Anthony Henday Energy Park (northeast)

Anthony Henday Horse Hill (northeast)
Anthony Henday Lake District (north)
Anthony Henday Mistatim (northwest)
Anthony Henday Rampart (northwest)

Anthony Henday South (southwest)
Anthony Henday South West (west)
Anthony Henday Southeast (southeast)
Anthony Henday Terwillegar (southwest)

List 

Note: * denotes a tie in rank

Business Improvement Areas 

In Edmonton, a Business Improvement Area (BIA; formerly business revitalization zone or BRZ) is "a specific geographic area of the city in which businesses pool resources and work together, through a formal association, to enhance the economic development of their area," such as through various improvements, initiatives, programs, promotions and festivals to attract customers. 

The authority for Edmonton to establish a BIA is enabled by section 50 of the Municipal Government Act. Some of Edmonton's BIAs share their name with neighbourhoods, but their boundaries do not coincide with those of the neighbourhoods. Edmonton has 13 BIAs :

124 Street and Area
Alberta Avenue
Beverly
Chinatown and Area
The Crossroads
Downtown
Fort Road and Area
French Quarter and Area
Kingsway
North Edge
Northwest Industrial
Old Strathcona
Stony Plain Road and Area

See also 
List of neighbourhoods in Calgary

References

External links 
Edmonton Federation of Community Leagues

Neighbourhoods
Edmonton